Forever's a Long, Long Time is an album of Hank Williams covers performed by Don Was to Was's own music. Was released the album, under the name Orquestra Was, on April 8, 1997 on Verve Forecast Records. The original CD release of the album also included a short film directed by Was, starring Sweet Pea Atkinson and Kris Kristofferson. The film was nominated for a Grammy Award for Best Long Form Music Video in 1997.

Track listing
	Once Upon A Time In Detroit –	1:55
	I Ain't Got Nothin' But Time –	8:27
	Never Again (Will I Knock On Your Door) –	3:52
	Excuse Me, Colonel, Could I Borrow Your Newspaper? –	4:56
	Detroit In A Time Upon Once –	0:58
	Forever's A Long, Long Time –	6:50
	You've Been Having A Rough Night, Huh? –	4:49
	Lost On The River –	13:04
	A Big Poem About Hell –	2:48
	I'm So Tired Of It All –	3:38

Personnel
Sweet Pea Atkinson –	vocals
Terence Blanchard –	flugelhorn, trumpet
Sir Harry Bowens –	vocals (background)
Lenny Castro –	percussion
Merle Haggard –	guitar, vocals
Herbie Hancock –	Fender Rhodes, piano
Wayne Kramer – guitar
Harvey Mason, Sr. –	drums
Donald Ray Mitchell –	vocals (background)
Sheila E. –	percussion
Was (Not Was) –	performer
Don Was –	bass, guitar, keyboards, saxophone

References

1997 albums
Verve Forecast Records albums
Covers albums
Hank Williams tribute albums